Giovanni Renosto (born 14 September 1960) is a retired professional cyclist from Italy. He won every national championship in motor-paced racing between 1986 and 1989. He also won the UCI Motor-paced World Championships in 1989 and finished in third place in 1986.

References

1960 births
Living people
Italian male cyclists
Sportspeople from Treviso
UCI Track Cycling World Champions (men)
Italian track cyclists
Cyclists from the Province of Treviso
20th-century Italian people